Soft sensor or virtual sensor is a common name for software where several measurements are processed together. Commonly soft sensors are based on control theory and also receive the name of state observer. There may be dozens or even hundreds of measurements. The interaction of the signals can be used for calculating new quantities that need not be measured. Soft sensors are especially useful in data fusion, where measurements of different characteristics and dynamics are combined. It can be used for fault diagnosis as well as control applications.

Well-known software algorithms that can be seen as soft sensors include e.g. Kalman filters. More recent implementations of soft sensors use neural networks or fuzzy computing.

Examples of soft sensor applications:

 Kalman filters for estimating the location
 Velocity estimators in electric motors
 Estimating process data using self-organizing neural networks
 Fuzzy computing in process control
 Estimators of food quality

See also 
 Virtual sensing
 State observer

References

External links
 Helsinki University of Technology
 Soft Sensors for process applications in gas industry

Sensors
Nonlinear filters
Linear filters